BRCA1 associated protein-1 (ubiquitin carboxy-terminal hydrolase) is a deubiquitinating enzyme that in humans is encoded by the BAP1 gene.  BAP1 encodes an 80.4 kDa nuclear-localizing protein with a ubiquitin carboxy-terminal hydrolase (UCH) domain that gives BAP1 its deubiquitinase activity.  Recent studies have shown that BAP1 and its fruit fly homolog, Calypso, are members of the polycomb-group proteins (PcG) of highly conserved transcriptional repressors required for long-term silencing of genes that regulate cell fate determination, stem cell pluripotency, and other developmental processes.

Nomenclature 
BAP1 is also known as:
 UniProt name: Ubiquitin carboxyl-terminal hydrolase BAP1
 ubiquitin carboxyl-terminal hydrolase like-2 (UCHL2)
 human cerebral protein 6 (hucep 6)
 human cerebral protein-13 (hucep-13)

Gene 
In humans, BAP1 is encoded by the BAP1 gene located on the short arm of chromosome 3 (3p21.31-p21.2).

Structure 
Human BAP1 is 729 amino acids long and has three domains:

 a ubiquitin carboxyl-terminal hydrolase (UCH) N-terminus catalytic domain, which removes ubiquitin from ubiquitylated substrates: residues 1-240, with an active site comprising the Cysteine91, Alanine95, and Glycine178 residues.
 a unique linker region, which includes a Host cell factor C1 binding domain at residues 356-385. 
 a C-terminal domain: residues 598-729, which includes a UCH37-like domain (ULD) at residues 675-693 and two Nuclear localization sequences at residues 656-661 and 717-722.

Function 
In both Drosophila and humans, BAP1 functions as the catalytic subunit of the Polycomb repressive deubiquitinase (PR-DUB) complex, which controls homeobox genes by regulating the amount of ubiquitinated  Histone H2A in Nucleosomes bound to their promoters. In flies and humans, the PR-DUB complex is formed through the interaction of BAP1 and ASXL1 (Asx in fruit flies) BAP1 has also been shown to associate with other factors involved in chromatin modulation and transcriptional regulation, such as Host cell factor C1, which acts as an adaptor to couple E2F transcription factors to chromatin-modifying complexes during cell cycle progression.

Role in disease 
In cancer, BAP1 can function both as a tumor suppressor and as a metastasis suppressor.

Somatic mutations in cancer 
 BAP1 somatic mutations were identified in a small number of breast and lung cancer cell lines, but BAP1 was first shown to act as a tumor suppressor in cultured cells, where its deubiquitinase (UCH) domain and nuclear localization sequences were required for BAP1 to suppress cell growth. 
 In 2010, J. William Harbour and colleagues published a landmark article in Science, in which they used exome sequencing of patient tumor samples and identified inactivating mutations in BAP1 in 47% of uveal melanomas. They were also the first to show germline BAP1 mutations, and that BAP1 mutation was strongly associated with metastasis.  These mutations included multiple nonsense mutations and splice site mutations throughout the gene.  missense mutations were only found within the UCH and ULD domains, further supporting the requirement for BAP1 catalytic function.  This study also identified a germline mutation in one of the uveal melanoma patients, suggesting that, besides being a metastasis suppressor, BAP1 could predispose certain people to more aggressive uveal melanoma tumors. 
 BAP1 mutations have been identified in aggressive mesotheliomas with similar mutations as seen in melanomas,.
 Mutations in the tumor suppressor gene BAP1 occur in approximately 15% of clear cell renal cell carcinoma (CCRCC) cases. Sequencing efforts demonstrated worse outcomes in patients with BAP1 mutated clear cell renal cell carcinoma.

BAP1 tumor predisposition syndrome
Two studies used genome sequencing independently to identify germline mutations in BAP1 in families with genetic predispositions to mesothelioma and melanocytic skin tumors The atypical melanocytic lesions resemble Spitz nevi and have been characterized as "atypical Spitz tumors" (ASTs), although they have a unique histology and exhibit both BRAF and BAP1 mutations.  
Further studies have identified germline BAP1 mutations associated with other cancers.  These studies suggest that germline mutation of BAP1 results in a Tumor Predisposition Syndrome linking BAP1 to many more cancers.

Immunochemistry 
Immunohistochemistry for BAP1 is a prognostic biomarker to predict poor oncologic outcomes and adverse clinicopathological features in patients with non-metastatic clear cell renal cell carcinoma (CCRCC). BAP1 assessment using immunohistochemistry on needle biopsy may benefit preoperative risk stratification and guide treatment planning.

Interactions 
BAP1 has been shown to interact with

 AHCYL2
 ANAPC7
 ANKRD17
 ASXL1
 ASXL2
 BRCA1
 CBX1
 CBX3
 EIF4EBP3
 FOXK1
 FOXK2
 HAT1
 HCFC1
 HIST2H2AC
 HSPA2
 IPO4
 IPO5
 KDM1B
 OGT
 PPM1G
 PSME3
 RBBP7
 UBE2O

Model organisms
Model organisms have been used in the study of BAP1 function. A conditional knockout mouse line called Bap1tm1a(EUCOMM)Hmgu was generated at the Wellcome Trust Sanger Institute. Male and female animals underwent a standardized phenotypic screen to determine the effects of deletion. Additional screens performed:  - In-depth immunological phenotyping - in-depth bone and cartilage phenotyping

References

External links

Further reading 

 
 
 
 
 
 
 
 
 
 
 
 

Proteins
Microbiology
Human biology